Our Gang (1922) is an American Our Gang silent short film that was the third entry in the series to be released. It was directed by Charley Chase, Robert F. McGowan, Tom McNamara, and Fred Newmeyer.  The two-reeler was released into theaters on November 5, 1922 by Pathé.

Plot
Jimmy is trying to get the affections of Mary Jane. Mary Jane, however, is not interested in Jimmy, but rather is interested in rich kid Pat. The gang tries to help Sunshine Sammy get some clothes. They lure rich Pat into a trap in order to steal his clean clothes, but Pat beats them up. The gang then offers Pat a place in the gang, and they cut his hair and trade clothes with him. When Mary Jane sees Pat, she is disgusted. She soon sees Jimmy and Jackie wearing their new outfits. Later, Mary Jane's mother is trying to get some customers in her store while competing with a popular rival store across the street. Sunshine Sammy and Pat try to help Mary Jane by making the customers of the rival store think there are mad animals running around the store.

Cast

The Gang
Ernest Morrison as Ernie "Sunshine Sammy"
John Hatton as rich kid
Anna Mae Bilson as Mary Jane
Mickey Daniels as Mickey
Jackie Condon as Jackie
Dinah the Mule as herself

Additional cast
Helen Gilmore as Emil's wife
Wallace Howe as the rival merchant
Mark Jones as Emil, the drunk

Notes/Production Notes
 This short marked the first appearance of Our Gang regular Mickey Daniels.
 The only Our Gang short to feature Anna Mae Bilson and John Hatton.
 Charles Parrot, better known by the stage name Charley Chase served as the supervision director of Our Gang and earlier entries in the series.
 Fred C. Newmeyer was chosen to direct the original version of the film (no longer extant), which was shot in January 1922. After preview screenings, Roach scrapped Newmeyer's version and had fireman Robert F. McGowan and Tom McNamara come in to reshoot the short.
 No complete prints of this film are known to survive, but half of the film is held by private collectors and an edition is now on YouTube. It was previously considered a lost film.

See also
Our Gang filmography

References

External links
 
 
 

1922 films
1922 comedy films
American silent short films
Films directed by Charley Chase
Films directed by Robert F. McGowan
Films directed by Fred C. Newmeyer
Hal Roach Studios short films
American black-and-white films
Our Gang films
1922 short films
1920s American films
Silent American comedy films